Dunfermline is a city in Scotland.

Dunfermline may also refer to:

Dunfermline (Scottish Parliament constituency)
Dunfermline Palace, Scottish historic building
Dunfermline (horse), a racehorse
Dunfermline Athletic F.C., a football club
Dunfermline College of Physical Education
Dunfermline City railway station
Dunfermline, Illinois